As Long as They're Happy is a 1955 British musical comedy film directed by J. Lee Thompson and starring Jack Buchanan, Susan Stephen and Diana Dors. It is based on the 1953 play of the same name by Vernon Sylvaine. It was shot at Pinewood Studios near London with sets designed by the art director Michael Stringer.

Plot

The film is about a US singer named Bobby Denver, who is known as the "Crying Crooner" (a la Johnnie Ray), who stays with a stockbroker's family by mistake when he comes to England. The stockbroker, played by Jack Buchanan, has three very pretty daughters with the youngest Gwen (played by Janette Scott) madly in love with him so much she wants to marry him. Eventually, the stodgy stockbroker deals with his wife and daughter as well as his maid Linda (played by Joan Sims, who keeps fainting every time Bobby sings) being so infatuated.

Cast
 Jack Buchanan as John Bentley 
 Janette Scott as Gwen Bentley 
 Jeannie Carson as Pat Bentley 
 Brenda De Banzie as Stella Bentley 
 Susan Stephen as Corinne Bentley 
 Jerry Wayne as Bobby Denver 
 Diana Dors as Pearl Delaney 
 Hugh McDermott as Barnaby Brady 
 David Hurst as Dr. Hermann Schneider 
 Athene Seyler as Mrs. Arbuthnot 
 Joan Sims as Linda 
 Nigel Green as Peter 
 Dora Bryan as May 
 Gilbert Harding as himself 
 Joan Hickson as Barmaid 
 Peter Illing as French Sergeant 
 Edie Martin as Elderly fan 
 Hattie Jacques as Party girl
 Leslie Phillips as Box office manager
 Ronnie Stevens as Box intruder 
 Charles Hawtrey as Teddy boy
 Norman Wisdom as Norman (uncredited)

Production
The film was based on the comedy play by the British writer Vernon Sylvaine which was first staged in 1953 starring Jack Buchanan. It ran at the Garrick Theatre in the West End for 370 performances until May 1954. In April 1954 it was announced that Buchanan would appear in the film version; it would be his first starring role in a movie in 14 years. In August it was announced Jeanne Carson would co star.

It was Diana Dors second film for J. Lee Thompson. She was offered the lead but was unable to do it but agreed to play a guest part at £200 a day.

Reception
Variety said it would be "expected to register at home."

External links

References

Films directed by J. Lee Thompson
1955 films
British musical comedy films
1955 musical comedy films
Films shot at Pinewood Studios
Films set in London
Films set in Paris
Films set in Texas
1950s English-language films
British films based on plays
1950s British films